Crown Royal, also known as Seagram's Crown Royal, is a blended Canadian whisky brand created by Seagram and owned by Diageo since 2000. Production of Crown Royal is done at Gimli, Manitoba, while the blending and bottling of the whisky are done in a facility in Amherstburg, Ontario.

The whisky was introduced in 1939 by Samuel Bronfman for the 1939 royal tour of Canada. The whisky was sold exclusively in Canada until the 1960s, when it was first introduced to international markets. It is the top-selling brand of Canadian whisky in the United States.

Origins 
Crown Royal was introduced in 1939 by Samuel Bronfman, president of Seagram, as a tribute to the 1939 royal tour of Canada by King George VI and his wife, Queen Elizabeth, the first of a reigning monarch to Canada. It was available only in Canada until 1964, being introduced to the United States in the 1960s.

Production 
Crown Royal is produced solely at the company's distillery at Gimli, on the shores of Lake Winnipeg, Manitoba, Canada. The production of Crown Royal uses 10,000 bushels of rye, maize and barley daily, which is sourced from Manitoba and surrounding provinces, and requires  of water naturally filtered through the limestone beneath the lake.
The whisky is stored in 1.5 million barrels,
It is then blended and bottled in Amherstburg, Ontario.

Crown Royal was also produced in Waterloo, Ontario, until the distillery there closed in 1992.

Current Products 

Crown Royal was introduced in 1939 and is the original version of the brand. It was available only in Canada until 1964. Crown Royal comes in a purple felt-like bag with a gold tasseled drawstring.
Crown Royal Black was introduced in 2010, and is a darker, higher alcohol (90 proof) whisky. Comes in a black felt-like bag.
Crown Royal Reserve was introduced in 1992. The whiskies are aged for a longer period than the original. Crown Royal Reserve comes in a tan, velvet-like bag with coarse gold drawstrings. 
Crown Royal XR (Extra Rare) was introduced in 2006. This limited-release version was sold in numbered bottles and was originally made from the last batches of whiskey distilled at the now-closed Waterloo, Ontario, distillery; it now features whisky from the also now-closed Lasalle, Quebec, distillery. It received a 7¼ and 7¾ from Whisky Magazine critics. The LaSalle-based Crown Royal XR features a blue colour scheme to distinguish it from the red scheme of the original Waterloo-based version. 
Crown Royal XO was introduced in January 2014. It is a blend of 50 whiskies that is then finished in Cognac casks from the French Limousin forest. It is packaged in a bag with gray and gold embroidery accents.
Crown Royal Northern Harvest Rye was introduced in May 2015, and is packaged in an off-white felt-like bag.
Crown Royal Hand Selected Barrel was introduced in May 2015, and is a single barrel rye that is produced from the brand's Coffey rye still, the only one of its kind in North America. Selected retailers will be able to purchase an entire cask to dispense to their customers.
Crown Royal Monarch 75th Anniversary Blend was created in 2014 to commemorate the 1939 royal visit that inspired the brand and was prepared as a gift for the royal family.
Crown Royal Regal Apple was introduced in November 2014. It is a blend of Crown Royal with apple flavour. Sold in a green felt-like bag.
Crown Royal Vanilla Comes in a tan felt-like bag.
Crown Royal Salted Caramel Comes in a burnt-orange felt-like bag.
Crown Royal Peach was introduced in early 2019 and comes in a peach felt-like bag. (Limited Edition)

Discontinued variations

Crown Royal XR (Red) The first edition of Crown Royal XR contained the final batch of aged whiskies from the legendary Waterloo distillery and is a very rare find – it is no longer in production.
Crown Royal Cask No. 16 was introduced late 2007. It was made from over fifty blended and individually aged whiskies in 12-year-old cognac barrels. These barrels were made of oak from the Limousin forest in France. The whiskies were designed to have a cognac type of finish with notes of rye, grain, and fruit. Cask No. 16 comes in a black felt-like bag embroidered with the logo and name "CASK No 16". This blend was discontinued in late 2012.
Crown Royal Texas Mesquite was introduced in 2018 and came in a blue felt-like bag.
Crown Royal Honey
Crown Royal Maple Finished

Ratings 
Crown Royal offerings have generally performed well at international spirit ratings competitions. For example, the basic Canadian whisky was awarded a string of five gold medals at the San Francisco World Spirits Competitions between 2005 and 2012.
The Special Reserve received an editors choice gold award from Whisky Magazine and received ratings from 7¾ to 8¾ from three of the critics.

Jim Murray's "Whisky Bible" named Crown Royal's Northern Harvest Rye as the World Whisky of the Year for 2016.

Advertising 

Crown Royal advertises in motor sports, horse shows, and horse racing. It sponsored the No. 17 Ford Fusion of Matt Kenseth from 2010 to 2011, the No. 26 Ford Fusion of Jamie McMurray from 2006 to 2009, and has sponsored NASCAR Sprint Cup Series races since 2006. From 2004 until 2006, Crown Royal was the title sponsor of the International Race of Champions.

Crown Royal is a sponsor of the Grand American Road Racing Association's Rolex Sports Car Series. In 2010, it also began sponsoring the #60 Daytona Prototype car of Michael Shank Racing in the Rolex Sports Car Series.

The brand was a primary sponsor of the Washington International Horse Show for several years in the 1990s and from 1995 to 2008 sponsored the Crown Royal American Turf Stakes, a Thoroughbred horse race run at Churchill Downs on Kentucky Derby Day.

References

External links

 Crown Royal U.S. Web Site
 Crown Royal Canadian Web Site

Products introduced in 1939
Canadian alcoholic drinks
Canadian whisky
Diageo brands
Seagram
Cuisine of Manitoba
Gimli, Manitoba
Companies based in Manitoba
Alcohol in Manitoba